Pursuit of Momentary Happiness is the second studio album by English band Yak. It was released on 8 February 2019 through Third Man Records and Virgin EMI Records. The album was the band's first with bassist Vinny Davies after previous bassist Andy Jones moved to Australia.

Background
Following the release of the band's debut album Atlas Salvation, the band found themselves facing multiple obstacles when it came to writing a follow-up. Front man Oli Burslem had originally planned to spend a month song-writing in Japan before meeting bassist Andy Jones who had recently moved to Australia. Burslem was approached by Tame Impala and Pond member Jay Watson to write and record a new record in Perth. However, he found himself spending all the album advance money on alcohol and not writing material, leading him to lose all his money and have to live in his van for a year and a half.

The band recruited bassist Vinny Davies and decided to start working on the album from scratch. Shortly after they would meet Spiritualized frontman Jason Pierce who encouraged the band to pursue creating the album as well as to "get loads of influences." Burslem wrote 29 songs for the album and used the songs that "had a consistent theme" for the album.

In August 2018 the band announced their signing to Virgin EMI alongside a UK tour and the single White Male Carnivore. The album was announced on 6 December 2018, alongside the release of the single "Fried."

Music
The music of the album has been described as "psych-tinged" and "garage rock-informed." Bitter Sweet Symphonies.co.uk described the album as containing traces of later Beatles, Led Zeppelin, Roy Orbison, hardcore punk of the late ’80s, psychedelia of the late ’70s, and Leonard Cohen.

The first track on the album "Bellyache" was written while Burslem was living out of his car. He described the song as being "like the last piece of music we would ever make and that we had to put everything we had into it. That's where the last lyric "if you’re going for broke just make sure you don't choke" comes from." The song was compared to John Lennon at his rawest, "with the singer taunting some greedy fat cats reeling from their own gluttony."

The song "Fried" was described by Burslem as being about "our unsatisfiable desire to indulge in things that aren't good for us. However, once you get a taste for it, it's hard to stop and it's better to fully give way to the temptation."

The first single released from the album was the track "White Male Carnivore." The song was written while Burslem lived in Tokyo. Burslem decided to write a song from his point of view and said that "the three words which made me feel the most uncomfortable were white, male and carnivore. Everything currently seems reductive and polarising." The backing vocals in the track were compared to The Beach Boys.

The final song on the album "This House Has No Living Room" features Jason Pierce who adds vocals and slide guitar to the track as well as John Coxon who plays piano and harmonica. Burslem said that he'd be happy if the song was the last piece of music he ever made.

Track listing
All lyrics written by Yak, except where noted.

Personnel
Credits adapted from the album's liner notes.

Yak
Oli Burslem – vocals, guitar, production
Vincent Davies – bass guitar
Elliot Rawson – drums

Additional performers
J. Spaceman – piano & production on track 4, guitar on track 9, slide guitar & vocals on track 11
John Coxon – guitar on track 9, piano & harmonica on track 11
Elliott Arndt – flute on tracks 1 & 11
Martin Slattery – saxophone on tracks 1, 4 to 6, 8, 10 & 11
Nichol Thomson – trombone on tracks 1, 4, 6, 8 & 11
Tom Walsh – trumpet on tracks 1, 4, 6, 8 & 11

Production
Marta Salogni – production
Claudius Mittendorfer – mixing
John Davis – mastering engineer
Ross Fortune – recording engineer

Artwork
Jonny Lu Studio – art direction, sleeve design
Nick Waplington – artwork, photography

References

2019 albums
Third Man Records albums